Track or Tracks may refer to:

Routes or imprints
 Ancient trackway, any track or trail whose origin is lost in antiquity
 Animal track, imprints left on surfaces that an animal walks across
 Desire path, a line worn by people taking the shortest/most convenient route across fields, parks or woods
 Forest track, a track (unpaved road) or trail through a forest
 Fossil trackway, a type of trace fossil, usually preserving a line of animal footprints
 Trackway, an ancient route of travel or track used by animals
 Trail
 Vineyard track, a land estate (defined by law) meant for the growing of vine grapes

Arts, entertainment, and media

Films
 Tracks (1976 film), an American film starring Dennis Hopper
 Tracks (2003 film), a 2003 animated short film
 Tracks (2013 film), an Australian film starring Mia Wasikowska
 The Track (film), a 1975 French thriller–drama film

Literature
 Tracks (novel), written by Native American author Louise Erdrich
 Tracks, a 1980 book by Australian writer Robyn Davidson, source of the 2013 film in the section above
 The Tracks, a young adult novel series by J. Gabriel Gates and Charlene Keel

Music
 Track Records, a record label founded in 1966 in London, England

Albums
 Tracks (Oscar Peterson album), 1970
 Tracks (Liverpool Express album), 1976
 Tracks (Bruce Springsteen album), 1998
 Tracks (Collin Raye album), 2000

Songs
 "Track #1", the original title of "Stinkfist", at the time of its release to avoid removal from the band Tool
 "Tracks", by Gary Numan on his album The Pleasure Principle
 "Tracks", by Juliana Hatfield on her album Wild Animals
 "Tracks", by Roam on their album Backbone

Music production
 Audio signal or Audio channel, recorded in a recording studio
 Music track, a recorded piece of music

Other arts, entertainment, and media
 Tracks (Law & Order: UK), an episode on the television series Law and Order: UK
 Tracks (magazine), Australian surf magazine
 Tracks – The Train Set Game, a 2017 video game developed by Whoop Games, commonly referred to as Tracks
 Tracks (Transformers), a Transformers character
 "Tracks", an episode of the television series Zoboomafoo

Electronics and computing
 Track (optical disc), consecutive set of sectors on the disc containing a block of data
 Track (disk drive), a circular path on the surface of a disk or diskette on which information is recorded and read
 Tracks in magnetic stripe card

Sport
 All-weather running track, a rubberized surface for track and field competitions
 Cinder track, generally a refined dirt running track for track and field competitions
 First tracks, in winter sports, cutting through fresh snow or ice before anyone else does
 List of bobsleigh, luge, and skeleton tracks
 Long track speed skating
 Race track
 Tartan track, a brand of all-weather running track that has become genericized
 The Track, a multi-use stadium in Saint Sampson, Guernsey
 Track and field athletics
 Track cycling
 Velodrome, a track for bicycles, track cycling competitions

Transportation
 Track (rail transport), metal tracks on which trains ride
 Track gauge, the distance between rails
 Bus track, a track for certain buses, like the O-Bahn buses
 Axle track, the distance between centres of roadwheels on an axle of a motor vehicle
 Continuous track, a belt providing motive traction for a tracked vehicle such as a tank or a bulldozer
 Course (navigation), the path a vessel or aircraft plots over the surface of the Earth
 Ground track, the path on the surface of the Earth directly below an aircraft or satellite
 Ocean track, in flight planning, the path of an aircraft as determined by heading, slip, and wind effects

Other uses
 Conference track, a group of talks on a certain topic that are usually made in parallel with others
 Tracks Inc (Tracks Dance Theatre), based in Darwin, Australia
 Recording of one song or piece of music

See also
 Sidetrack (disambiguation)
 Sidetracked (disambiguation)
 TRAC (disambiguation)
 Track and trace
 Tracker (disambiguation)
 Tracking (disambiguation)
 Transnational Association of Christian Colleges and Schools (TRACS)
 Trek (disambiguation)